Florence Lina Mouissou (sometimes Florence Lina Bamona-Mouissou) is a novelist from the Republic of Congo, currently living in Paris, France.

Early life
Mouissou was born in 1972. After completing her primary and secondary schooling at Pointe-Noire, she travelled to Paris to study literature. She also received a screenwriting diploma from Cinécours in Quebec.

Published works
Le plus vieux métier du monde. Nice: Editions Bénévent, 2005. .
Le Destin d'Aminata. Paris: L'Harmattan, 2009. .

References

1972 births
Living people
Republic of the Congo writers
Women novelists
Republic of the Congo women
Writers from Paris
Republic of the Congo women writers